Dendrolimus pini, the pine-tree lappet, is a moth of the family Lasiocampidae. The species was first described by Carl Linnaeus in his 1758 10th edition of Systema Naturae. It is found in most of Europe ranging to eastern Asia.

The wingspan is 45–70 mm. The moth flies from June to August depending on the location.

The larvae feed on Scots pine (Pinus sylvestris), but also other Pinus species, as well as Norway spruce (Picea abies) and silver fir (Abies alba).

Gallery

External links

Pine-tree lappet at UKMoths
Lepiforum.de

Lasiocampidae
Moths described in 1758
Moths of Asia
Moths of Europe
Taxa named by Carl Linnaeus